Elizabeth Emma Soyer, née Jones (5 September 1813 – 30 August 1842) was an English oil painter, known as Emma Jones or Emma Soyer.

Biography

Elizabeth Emma Jones was born in London in 1813, and was instructed in French, Italian, and music. At a very early age she became a pupil of the Belgian painter François Simonau (1783–1859), who in 1820 married her mother, Mrs. Jones. Finding that Emma had talents for drawing, Simoneau devoted the whole of his time to her instruction, and before the age of twelve she "had drawn more than a hundred portraits from life with gret fidelity". She also became a talented pianist under the tutelage of Jean Ancot.

On 12 April 1837 she married Alexis Soyer, the first senior chef at the Reform Club. She then turned her attention to portraits in oil, and, with Simoneau, travelled in the provinces, working in Canterbury, Ramsgate and Shrewsbury and gained great popularity. Upon her return to London she produced "The Blind Boy", "The Crossing Sweeper", "The Bavarians", "Taglioni" and the "Kentish Ceres". In 1842 she completed her last work, "The Two Organ Boys". She also showed two paintings at the 1842 Paris Salon ("L'aveugle de la tour de Londres" and "Portrait de M. Soyer" - Nos. 1729–30). Her portrait of Soyer was engraved by Henry Bryan Hall.

On 29–30 August 1842 she had complications with her pregnancy, owing to fright produced by a thunderstorm, and she died the same night at her residence near Charing Cross, London. She was buried at Kensal Green Cemetery, London on 8 September, where her husband erected a large monument to her memory. In her obituary, The Gentleman's Magazine described her as "Cut off when her reputation was about to make her fortune, and when, in spite of all obstacles, her merits were become known to her countrymen".

Between 1823 and 1843 fourteen of her pictures were exhibited at the Royal Academy, thirty-eight at the British Institution, and fourteen at the Suffolk Street Gallery (Graves, Dictionary of Artists, pp. 130, 221).

In June 1848 one hundred and forty of her works were exhibited at the Prince of Wales's bazaar, under the name of Soyer's Philanthropic Gallery, on behalf of the Spitalfields soup kitchen, and a catalogue was printed. Among these pictures was "The Young Savoyards Resting", a work which obtained for Madame Soyer the name of the "English Murillo". Two of her pieces, "The Jew Lemon Boys" and "The English Ceres", were engraved by Gérard. In Paris, where many of her pictures were exhibited, her reputation stood higher than in her native country.

Legacy
In September 2018 Soyer's painting of two black girls, in a tropical landscape, possibly painted for the slavery abolitionist cause in Britain, was featured on the BBC One television programme Fake or Fortune?.

Her portrait of Alexis Soyer is still in the collection of the Reform club.

References

Further reading

External links

1813 births
1842 deaths
English women painters
Deaths in childbirth
19th-century British women artists
Burials at Kensal Green Cemetery
Artists from London
19th-century British painters
19th-century English women
19th-century English people